Jôkokuite is a manganese sulfate mineral with chemical formula MnSO4・5H2O. It crystallizes in the triclinic crystal system. It was discovered in 1976 by Matsuo Nanbu at the Jokoku mine in Hokkaido, and is named after the location.

References

Sulfate minerals
Manganese minerals
Triclinic minerals
Chalcanthite group